Mich (also Romanized as Mīch; also known as Hīch-e Bālā, Mīch Bālā, Mīch-e Bālā, Mīj, and Mīj-e Bālā) is a village in Rud Ab-e Gharbi Rural District, Rud Ab District, Narmashir County, Kerman Province, Iran. At the 2006 census, its population was 387, in 100 families.

References 

Populated places in Narmashir County